Lynn Leibovitz (born May 8, 1959) is an associate judge of the Superior Court of the District of Columbia.

Education and career 
Leibovitz earned her Bachelor of Arts from Brown University in 1981, and her Juris Doctor from Georgetown University Law Center in 1985. After graduating, she clerked for Superior Court of the District of Columbia judge Robert I. Richter.

She joined the faculty of Georgetown University Law Center in 1997, where she served as an adjunct professor of trial advocacy until 2006.

D.C. superior court 
On May 14, 2001, President George W. Bush nominated Leibovitz to be an associate judge of the Superior Court of the District of Columbia to the seat vacated by Judge Stephen G. Milliken. On July 26, 2001, the Senate Committee on Governmental Affairs held a hearing on her nomination. On August 2, 2001, the Committee reported her nomination favorably to the senate floor. On August 3, 2001, the full Senate confirmed her nomination by voice vote. She was sworn in on September 21, 2005.

Notable cases 
In 2010, judge Leibovitz presided over the Murder case of Robert Eric Wone, she found the three men involved not guilty on charges of conspiracy, obstruction of justice, and tampering with evidence.

Personal life 
Leibovitz was born and raised in New York City. In 1982, she moved to Washington D.C. where she has been living since. She is married and has two children.

References

1959 births
Living people
21st-century American judges
21st-century American women judges
American women academics
Brown University alumni
Georgetown University Law Center alumni
Georgetown University Law Center faculty
Judges of the Superior Court of the District of Columbia
Lawyers from New York City